2-Bromobutyric acid is a carboxylic acid with the molecular formula C4H7BrO2. It is a colorless liquid. The 2-position is stereogenic, so there are two enantiomers of this compound. 2-Bromobutyric acid is mainly used as a building block chemical, such as in the preparation of Levetiracetam, an anticonvulsant medication.

Production
(±)-2-Bromobuyric acid may be prepared by the acid-catalyzed Hell–Volhard–Zelinsky reaction, where butyric acid is treated with elemental bromine.

References

Carboxylic acids
Organobromides